Nationality words link to articles with information on the nation's poetry or literature (for instance, Irish or France).

Events
 March – Japanese poet Sadako Kurihara's "Bringing Forth New Life"  (生ましめんかな, Umashimen-kana) is published. Publication this year of her first collection, The Black Egg (Kuroi tamago), is permitted during the occupation of Japan only in abridged form because of its treatment of the atomic bombing of Hiroshima experienced by the poet.
 May 20 – W. H. Auden becomes a United States citizen.
 Ezra Pound is brought back to the United States on treason charges but found unfit to face trial because of insanity and sent to St. Elizabeths Hospital in Washington, D.C., where he remains for 12 years (to 1958).
 Upon learning about Isaiah Berlin's visit to Russian poet Anna Akhmatova this year, Joseph Stalin's associate Andrei Zhdanov, with the approval of the Soviet Central Committee, issues the "Zhdanov decree" denouncing her as a "half harlot, half nun", and has her poems banned from publication. This resolution is directed against two literary magazines, Zvezda and Leningrad, which have published supposedly apolitical, "bourgeois", individualistic works of Akhmatova and the satirist Mikhail Zoshchenko. In time Akhmatova's son will spend his youth in Stalinist gulags and she will resort to publishing several poems in praise of Stalin to secure his release.
 Takashi Matsumoto founds a literary magazine, Fue ("Flute") in Japan.
 Martin Starkie founds Oxford University Poetry Society in Oxford, England.

MacSpaunday
Roy Campbell, in his Talking Bronco, first published this year, invents the name "MacSpaunday" to designate a composite figure made up of the poets
 Louis MacNeice ("Mac")
 Stephen Spender ("sp")
 W. H. Auden ("au-n")
 Cecil Day-Lewis ("day")
Campbell, in common with much literary journalism of the period, imagines the four as a group of like-minded poets, although they share little but very broadly left-wing views.

Works published in English
Listed by nation where the work was first published and again by the poet's native land, if different; substantially revised works listed separately:

Canada
 Louis Dudek. East of the City. Toronto: Ryerson Press, 1946.
 Robert Finch, Poems.
 Wilson MacDonald, Armand Dussault. Toronto: Macmillan.
 P. K. Page, As Ten As Twenty.
 A. J. M. Smith, ed. Seven Centuries of Verse.

India, in English
 Anilbaran, Songs from the Soul (Poetry in English), Calcutta: Amiya Library
 Harindranath Chattopadhyaya:
 Edgeways and the Saint (Poetry in English) a farce; Bombay: Nalanda Publications
 The Son of Adam (Poetry in English), Bombay: Padma Publications
 Nolini Kanta Gupta, East Beams (Poetry in English),
 P. R. Kaikini, Selected Poems (Poetry in English), Bombay
 H. G. Rawlinson, editor, Garland of Indian Poetry (Poetry in English), London: Royal India Society; anthology; Indian poetry published in the United Kingdom
 S. H. Vatsyayana, Prison Days and Other Poems (Poetry in English), Benares: Indian Publishers

New Zealand
 Allen Curnow, Jack Without Magic (Caxton), New Zealand
 Kendrick Smithyman, Seven Sonnets, Auckland: Pelorus Press
 J. C. Reid, Creative Writing in New Zealand, with two chapters on poetry, scholarship, New Zealand

United Kingdom
 Lilian Bowes Lyon, A Rough Walk Home
 Rupert Brooke, The Poetical Works of Rupert Brooke, comprising the contents of Collected Poems of 1928 and 26 additional poems; published posthumously
 Roy Campbell, Talking Bronco, South African native living in and published in the United Kingdom
 Walter De la Mare, The Traveller
 Lawrence Durrell, Cities, Plains and People
 Robert Graves, Poems 1938–1945
 Fredoon Kabraji, editor, This Strange Adventure: An Anthology of Poems in English by Indians 1828-1946, London: New India Pub. Co., 140 pages; Indian poetry published in the United Kingdom
 Maurice Lindsay, editor, Modern Scottish Poetry: An Anthology of the Scottish Renaissance 1920-1945 (Faber and Faber)
 Norman MacCaig, The Inward Eye
 Hugh MacDiarmid, pen name of Christopher Murray Grieve, Poems of the East-West Synthesis
 John Clark Milne, The Orra Loon and Other Poems.
 Kathleen Raine, Living in Time
 Herbert Read, Collected Poems
 Henry Reed, A Map of Verona, including "Naming of Parts"
 Vita Sackville-West, The Garden
 Sydney Goodsir Smith, The Devil's Waltz
 Bernard Spencer, Aegean Islands and Other Poems
 Dylan Thomas, Deaths and Entrances, including "Fern Hill" and "A Refusal to Mourn the Death, by Fire, of a Child in London"
 R. S. Thomas, The Stones of the Fields

United States
 Stephen Vincent Benet, The Last Circle (Houghton Mifflin)
 Elizabeth Bishop, North & South (Houghton Mifflin)
 Cleanth Brooks, The Well Wrought Urn: Studies in the Structure of Poetry, criticism
 Owen Dodson, Powerful Long Ladder
 H.D., "The Flowering of the Rod", the final part of Trilogy, a  three-part poem on the experience of the blitz in wartime London
 John Gould Fletcher, The Burning Mountain
 Denise Levertov, The Double Image
 Robert Lowell, Lord Weary's Castle, New York: Harcourt, Brace
 Phyllis McGinley, Stones from a Glass House
 James Merrill, The Black Swan (won Glascock Prize)
 Josephine Miles, Local Measures
 Howard Moss, The Wound and the Weather
 Lorine Niedecker, New Goose, her first poetry collection
 Kenneth Patchen, Sleepers Awake
 Edouard Roditi, translator, Young Cherry Trees Secured Against Hares, translated from the original French of André Breton; publisher: View
 Mark Van Doren, The Country New Year
 William Carlos Williams, Paterson, Book I
 Reed Whittemore, Heroes & Heroines

Other in English
 Roy Campbell, Talking Bronco, South African native published in the United Kingdom
 Denis Devlin, Lough Derg and Other Poems, Irish poet published in the United States
 James McAuley, Under Aldebaran, Australia

Works published in other languages
Listed by nation where the work was first published and again by the poet's native land, if different; substantially revised works listed separately:

France
 Yves Bonnefoy, Traité du pianiste
 Jean Cayrol, Poems de la nuit et du brouillard
 Aimé Césaire, Les armes miraculeuses, Martinique poet published in France; Paris: Gallimard
 René Char, Feuillets d'Hypnos
 Paul Éluard, Le dur désir de durer
 Léon-Paul Fargue, Méandres
 Jean Hervé, Jour, winner of the Prix Apollinaire
 Francis Jammes, La Grâce
 Pierre Jean Jouve, La Vierge de Paris poems from The Resistance
 Alphonse Métérié, Vétiver
 Jacques Prévert, Paroles
 Saint-John Perse:
 Exil, suivi de Poème à l'etrangère, Pluies, Neiges
 Vents, Paris: Gallimard
 Philippe Soupault, L'Arme secrète
 Jules Supervielle, 1939–1945
 Tristan Tzara, pen name of Sami Rosenstock, Terre sur Terre

Indian subcontinent
Including all of the British colonies that later became India, Pakistan, Bangladesh, Sri Lanka. And also from the country Nepal. Listed alphabetically by first name, regardless of surname:

Hindi
 Girija Kumar Mathur, Nas aur Nirman, poems of the Pragativadi school
 Ramadhari Singh Dinkar, Kuruksetra, narrative poem based on the Santi Parva of the Mahabharata
 Rangeya Raghava, Pighlate Patthar, poems with a strong Marxist influence

Kannada
 G. B. Joshi, Dattavani, critical appraisal of the poems of Kannada poet D. R. Bendre
 K. V. Puttappa, Prema Kasmira, 56 love poems
 V. K. Gokak, Indina Kannada Kavyada Gottugurialu, critical survey of modern poetry in Kannada

Kashmiri
 Mirza Arif, Laila Wa Mustafa, a masnavi
 Shamas-ud Din Kafoor, Nendre Lotuyae Yoot Koetah, a vatsun poem on the poverty of Kashmiri peasants; the work first appeared in Hamdard, a weekly periodical, and was later included in Payame Kafoor
 Abdul Ahad Azad, Shikwa-e-Iblis, a complaint about unquestioning social conformity

Tamil
 P. S. Subrahmaniya Shastri, Vatamoli Nul Varalaru, literary history of Sanskrit literature, written in Tamil
 R. P. Sethu Pillai, Kiristuvat Tamilttontar, Tamil-language literary history on the contributions of Christian scholars, including Beschi, Pope, Caldwell and Vitanayakam Pillai to that language's literature and culture
 V. R. M. Chettiyar, Nanku Kavimanikal, Tamil biographical and critical study of Percy Bysshe Shelley, John Keats, Rabindranath Tagore and the Tamil poet Kambar (poet), also known as "Kampan" (1180–1250)

Other Indian languages
 Akhtarul Imam, Tarik Sayyara; Urdu-language
 Amrita Pritan, Pathar Gite; Punjabi-language
 Bayabhav, also known as Kashinath Shridhar Naik, Sadeavelim Fulam, Konkani
 Buddhadeb Basu, Kaler Putul, an essay of literary criticism in Bengali of poets and their work after Rabindranath Tagore
 Chaganti Seshaiah, Andhra Kavi Tarangini, first volume in a 10-volume literary history written in the Telugu language (the last volume came out in 1953)
 Chandrasinha, Sip, nine works of poetic prose in Rajasthani
 Dinu Bhai Pant, Mangu Di Chabila, Dogri narrative poem on bonded laborers exploited by village money lenders
 E. M. S. Nampudirippadu, Purogamana Sahityam an essay in Malayalam by a leader of the Marxist Communist Party on the idea of progressive literature; influential with many young authors
 Ishar Singh Ishar, Rangila Bhaia, humorous, Punjabi-language poems featuring Bhaia, a humorous character created by the poet for this and other works
 Jandhyala Papayya Sastry, Vijaya Sri, popular kavya in classical meter about the victory of Arjuna; an allegory of the Indian independence movement; Telugu
 Laksmiprasad Devkota, Sulocana, Nepali-language epic using more than a dozen Sanskrit meters; the poem, written in response to a challenge to prove the author's credentials as an epic poet, does not defy the norms of epics in Sanskrit poetics; based on a social theme
 Mayadhar Mansinha, Sadhabajhia, Oriya-language, romantic poetry
 Sundaram, Arvacin Kavita, literary history in Gujarati of that language's poetry from 1845 to 1945

Other languages
 Josef Čapek, Básně z koncentračního tabora ("Poems from a Concentration Camp"), Czech, published posthumously
 Hushang Ebtehaj (H. E. Sayeh) نخستین نغمه‌ها ("The First Songs"), Persian poet published in Iran
 Odysseus Elytis, An Heroic And Funeral Chant For The Lieutenant Lost In Albania, Greek
 G. Groll, editor, De profundis, anthology of non-Nazi texts, Germany
 Ilmar Laaban, Ankruketi lõpp on laulu algus, Estonian poet published in Sweden
 Pier Paolo Pasolini, I Diarii ("The Diaries"), Italy

Awards and honors

Awards and honors in the United States
 Consultant in Poetry to the Library of Congress (later the post would be called "Poet Laureate Consultant in Poetry to the Library of Congress"): Karl Shapiro appointed this year
 Pulitzer Prize for Poetry: No award given
 Fellowship of the Academy of American Poets: Edgar Lee Masters

Awards and honors elsewhere
 France: Académie française: Paul Claudel elected, April 4
 Canada: Governor General's Award, poetry or drama: Poems, Robert Finch

Births
Death years link to the corresponding "[year] in poetry" article:
 February 7 – Brian Patten, English member of the Liverpool poets
 February 8 – Gert Jonke (died 2009), Austrian novelist, playwright, screenwriter and poet
 April 26 – Marilyn Nelson, American
 May 8 – Ruth Padel, English poet and writer
 May 10 – Chandiroor Divakaran, Indian Malayalam language poet and folk-song writer
 June 28 – John Birtwhistle, English poet and librettist
 July 27 – Peter Reading (died 2011), English 
 August 5 – Ron Silliman, American
 August 9 – Juris Kronbergs (died 2020), Latvian-Swedish poet and translator
 September 9 – Maura Stanton, American
 September 30 – Larry Levis (died 1996), American
 October 14 – Alan Brunton (died 2002), New Zealand poet and scriptwriter
 October 28 – Sharon Thesen, Canadian
 December 20 – Andrei Codrescu, a Romanian-born American poet, novelist, essayist, screenwriter, and commentator for NPR
 December 30 – Patti Smith, American poet and musician
 Also:
 Tom Pickard, English poet, radio broadcaster, film maker and an initiator of the British Poetry Revival movement
 Joachim Sartorius, German

Deaths
Birth years link to the corresponding "[year] in poetry" article:
 January 9 – Countee Cullen, 42 (born 1903), African American poet
 March 1 – Adriana Porter, 89 (born 1857), Wiccan poet
 March 26 – Amir Hamzah, 35 (born 1911), Indonesian poet styled a national hero
 May 25 – Ernest Rhys, 87 (born 1859), British poet, author, novelist, essayist best known for his role as founding editor of the Everyman's Library series of affordable classics
 July 8 – Orrick Glenday Johns, 59 (born 1887), American poet and playwright
 July 27 – Gertrude Stein, 73 (born 1874), American poet and dramatist, of cancer
 August 18
 Marion Angus, 81 (born 1865), Scottish poet
 Amulya Barua, 24 (born 1922), Assamese poet first published posthumously this year, killed in communal violence
 September 9 – Violet Jacob, 83 (born 1863), Scottish historical novelist and poet
 November 29 – Johannes Vares (Barbarus), 56 (born 1890), Estonian poet, doctor and radical politician, suicide

See also

 Poetry
 List of poetry awards
 List of years in poetry

Notes

20th-century poetry
Poetry